Precursorism, called in its more extreme forms precursoritis or precursitis, is a characteristic of that kind of historical writing in which the author seeks antecedents of present-day institutions or ideas in earlier historical periods.  This kind of anachronism is considered to be a form of Whig history and is a special problem among historians of science.  The French historian of medieval science, Pierre Duhem, exemplifies several of the characteristics of the quest for precursors of modern scientific ideas.  Duhem was trained as a physicist, rather than as a historian; he was French and many of the precursors he identified were French or studied at the University of Paris; he was a devout Catholic and many of the precursors of the theologically troubling Italian, Galileo, were members of religious orders.  Most striking among them was the French bishop and scholastic philosopher, Nicole Oresme.

The concept has been applied to those who would find precursors of Darwin in the early nineteenth century, and to those who would find anticipations of modern science in ancient cultures from the Near East to Mesoamerica.  Precursorism has recently been identified as a significant factor in some studies of the work of Islamic scientists.

It is now commonly assumed that historians of science should study past scientific "ideas  in their own right, avoiding anachronism and precursoritis."

Notes

Historiography of science